Brad King (born February 12, 1956) is a former Democratic member of the Utah State House of Representatives, representing the state's 69th house district in Price from 1997 to 2008. He served as the Minority Leader in the Utah House during 2008. He left his seat to run for State Senate in 2008, a race which he lost to David Hinkins. He then ran again for reelection in 2014.

Personal life and education
King was born on February 12, 1956. He is married to his wife Tami. He grew up in Price, Utah, where he currently resides.

King received an Associate in Science from the College of Eastern Utah. He went onto achieve a Bachelor of Science and Master of Science from Brigham Young University. King led a career as an educator, but is currently retired.

Political career
King was elected as Representative to the Utah State House in 1996, for which he served consecutively through 2008. In 2007, he served as Minority Whip, and in 2008 he served as Minority Leader. In 2008, he ran for Utah State Senate in District 27 and lost, losing his House seat. In 2014, King sought the State House seat again. He was unopposed in the Democratic convention and won the general election on November 4, 2014 with 5,298 votes (55.6%) against Republican nominee Bill Labrum.

In the 2016 legislative session, King served on the Infrastructure and General Government Appropriations Subcommittee, House Business and Labor Committee, House Rules Committee and the House Transportation Committee.

Organizations
King has been a member of the following organizations:
Honorary Colonel, Utah Highway Patrol, present
Past President, Utah Professionals in Student Activities
Past President, Utah School Counselors Association
Utah Public Employees' Association

2016 sponsored legislation

King floor sponsored SB 69 Children's Heart Disease Special Group License Plates and SB 195 Highway Bridge Designation Amendments.

See also
 List of Utah State Legislatures
 Utah Democratic Party
 Utah Republican Party
 Utah House of Representatives

External links
Utah House of Representatives - Brad King 'official UT House profile
Project Vote Smart - Brad King profileFollow the Money'' - Brad King
2006 2004 2002 2000 1998 1996 campaign contributions

References

1956 births
Brigham Young University alumni
Living people
Democratic Party members of the Utah House of Representatives
21st-century American politicians
People from Price, Utah